Fairfax Township may refer to the following townships in the United States:

 Fairfax Township, Linn County, Iowa
 Fairfax Township, Polk County, Minnesota